L.U.V is the fifth Japanese single of the South Korean boy group, BTOB. It was released on June 15, 2016 by Kiss Entertainment. The single album also peaked at #1 on the Daily and Weekly Oricon Singles Chart, making it BTOB's first Japanese single to reach number 1. It sold more than 62,000 copies on its first day, and 77,000 copies on its first week. The song also reached number-one on the Billboard Japan Hot 100.

The album is available in 5 different versions— a Limited Edition CD+DVD version, 3 Regular Edition CDs with different B-sides, and individual CD covers of each member.

Track listing

Chart performance

References

External links

2016 singles
Japanese-language songs
2016 songs
Oricon Weekly number-one singles
Billboard Japan Hot 100 number-one singles
BtoB songs